Plagiomimicus spumosum, the frothy moth, is a moth of the family Noctuidae. The species was first described by Augustus Radcliffe Grote in 1874. It is found in North America, where it has a transcontinental range in the United States, north to southern Ontario and southern Alberta.

The wingspan is 33–40 mm. The forewings are dull grey brown to yellow brown, with a faint antemedian line and slightly more prominent postmedian line. The forewings are slightly paler in the basal and terminal areas. The hindwings are lighter brown, almost white in the basal half. Adults are on wing in mid-summer in one generation per year.

The larvae feed on Helianthus annuus. They burrow into the head of the host plant and feed on the seeds.

References

Moths described in 1874
Stiriinae
Moths of North America